Tyler Codron (born October 20, 1986 in Port Coquitlam, British Columbia) is a professional lacrosse player for the Vancouver Warriors in the National Lacrosse League. He previously played for the Portland LumberJax, Washington Stealth, Edmonton Rush and Colorado Mammoth. He also formerly played football for the University of British Columbia.

Codron was drafted in the first round (6th overall) in the 2006 NLL Entry Draft by the Portland LumberJax.  He played his first two seasons with Portland and was named to the 2008 NLL Rookie Team. After the Portland LumberJax folded, he was selected by the Toronto Rock 2nd overall in the 2009 dispersal draft. He did not start the season with the Rock due to a torn ACL. In December 2009, he was traded from the Rock along with Joel Dalgarno and Lewis Ratcliff to the Washington Stealth for Colin Doyle and a 2nd round pick in the 2012 NLL Entry Draft. In the 2015 season, he won the Jay Jalbert Award as the Mammoth Teammate of the Year.

Statistics

NLL
Reference:

References

1986 births
Living people
Canadian lacrosse players
Colorado Mammoth players
Edmonton Rush players
Lacrosse defenders
Lacrosse people from British Columbia
People from Port Coquitlam
Players of Canadian football from British Columbia
Portland LumberJax players
UBC Thunderbirds football players
Vancouver Warriors players
Washington Stealth players